Gianluca Segarelli (born February 23, 1978 in Spoleto) is an Italian professional football player.

External links
 Career summary by lega-calcio.it

1978 births
Living people
Italian footballers
Serie B players
A.C. Perugia Calcio players
Vis Pesaro dal 1898 players
Calcio Padova players
A.C. Ancona players
A.C. Cesena players
U.S. Alessandria Calcio 1912 players
Association football midfielders